Qi Ying (born 23 January 1997) is a Chinese sport shooter.

He participated at the 2018 ISSF World Shooting Championships, winning a medal.

References

External links

Living people
1997 births
Chinese male sport shooters
Trap and double trap shooters
Sportspeople from Zibo
Shooters at the 2018 Asian Games
Asian Games competitors for China
21st-century Chinese people